The Breda Ba.33 was an Italian light sport aircraft designed and built by the Breda company.

Design and development

Ing Cesare Pallavicino of the Breda company led the design and development of the Ba.33. The first version, the Ba.33 Serie 1, was a two-seat low-wing monoplane with external bracing between the wings and the fuselage. It was powered by an 89-kilowatt (120-horsepower) de Havilland Gipsy III four-cylinder air-cooled inline engine. Later, two versions of the Ba.33 Serie 2 appeared, one with the de Havilland Gipsy engine and another with a Colombo engine.

Breda also developed a single-seat version of the aircraft, the Ba.33S; differing from the Ba.33 in being a single-seater and having an enclosed cockpit and a more powerful engine, the  Colombo S63 engine.

Operational history
After the Ba.33 first flew in 1930, the aircraft and its variants proved to be a very successful series of touring and racing aircraft during the 1930s. In 1931, a Ba.33 won the Giro aereo d'Italia ("Air Tour of Italy") race.

Ba.33s were the equipment of the Italian team for the International Touring Competition in 1932, with which also Winifred Spooner entered the contest. Ambrogio Colombo was a leader in the contest after technical trials. However, two Bredas crashed on 23 August 1932, due to weak wing construction (one mechanic died bailing out), and Italy decided to withdraw all the Italian teams from the contest.

Variants
Ba.33 Serie 1
Original two-seat version with 89-kilowatt (120-horsepower) de Havilland Gipsy III engine.
Ba.33 Serie 2
Two versions, one offered with a de Havilland Gipsy engine and one with a  Colombo S.63 engine.
Ba.33S
Improved single-seat version with enclosed cockpit and  Colombo S.63 engine.

Operators

Mainichi Shimbun a Japanese newspaper.

Specifications (Ba.33 Serie 1)

See also

Notes

References

External links

The "Breda 33" in Flight, August 19, 1932
www.airwar.ru Ba.33 (Russian)
www.superaereo.com Breda

Ba.033
1930s Italian sport aircraft
Single-engined tractor aircraft
Low-wing aircraft
Aircraft first flown in 1930